The Seven Iron Men, also known as Merritt Brothers, were iron-ore pioneers in the Mesabi Range in northeastern Minnesota and the creation of the city that is now known as Mountain Iron. In the late 1800s, the Merritt family founded the largest iron mine in the world and initiated the consolidation of the American railway system into what would ultimately become the United States Steel Corporation. Their story was told, in part, by the book Seven Iron Men by Paul de Kruif. The book was first published in 1929.

The brothers, actually five brothers and two nephews, charted the Mesabi Range and recorded the areas that demonstrated the highest potential for iron after they recognized what they had found. Due to the lack of railroads in the region, they were initially unable to transport the ore, but their discovery catalyzed the growth of railroads in the region. The railroad became the center of conflict between the Merritt Brothers and J.D. Rockefeller, to whom they were eventually forced to sell their stake in Mountain Iron in 1893.

Early life 
The primary figure of the Merritt family was Leonidas. He was born in Chautauqua County, New York, where he lived until age 7, when he moved to western Pennsylvania until age 12.
In 1856, his family moved to live in a community of five or six families in Duluth, Minnesota, just after the 1854 Treaty of La Pointe transferred land from the Indians and where his father, Lewis H. Merritt, worked as a lumberman and a millwright. He joined the Army to fight in the Civil War and returned after his father had failed to discover gold in the Vermillion or Mesabi Mountain Ranges. The black "banded ore" rocks that his father brought back to Duluth from the Mesabi Range convinced Leonidas to explore the Mesabi Mountains.

Geography 
Mesabi is derived from the Ojibwa word for "giant", but is said to have a broader meaning of "the grandmother of them all," as it relates to the division between water flowing into the Hudson Bay from the water flowing into Lake Superior. Geology professor Van Hise had proposed a "trough theory," explaining how the mountains potentially contained ore-filled troughs at various places. Leonidas developed a magnetic survey and mapped out the ore troughs in the area. With money saved 16 years working as a lumberjack, Leonidas bought land for $1.25 an acre and opened what became the largest iron mine in the world, Mountain Iron Mine.

Merritt Mining and Railroad Companies 
Leonidas was initially joined by his brother Alfred and later by five other family members, as they sought investors. They discovered iron in 1891, after building trails into the mountains and hiring villagers to drill into the troughs. The brothers reinvested their earnings. As soon as the iron was discovered, geologists explored the mountains. One mining expert scorned the Mountain Iron Mine, making it difficult to obtain outside investors. In 1891 the family incorporated the Duluth, Missabe and Northern Railway Company to build a 70-mile-long railroad. The Merritt's raised $400,000 that they advanced to the railroad company in exchange for bonds.

Economics 
The Seven Iron Brothers owned the largest iron mine in the world during the 1890s. Their success attracted the attention of other wealthy Americans, such as Rockefeller, who was expanding into the iron ore business at that time. The Merritt Brothers put their company stock up as collateral to borrow money from Rockefeller to fund the railroad. In the span of several months, the Merritt Brothers lost their personal wealth and interest in both their mining and railroad corporations. In a series of financial transactions, Rockefeller came to own both the Mountain Iron Mine and the Railroad, leaving the Merritt Brothers financially ruined. Rockefeller's move attracted the attention of Andrew Carnegie and through consolidations, the world’s first billion-dollar cooperation, the United States Steel Corporation, would be founded.

Legacy 
In 2011, the economic impact upon America of the steel industry was estimated to contribute $101.2 billion to US GDP and to support 943,045 jobs. It generated $22.9 billion in tax revenues and created seven jobs in the United States economy for every one job created in the steel industry.

See also
 U.S. Steel
 John D. Rockefeller

References

Sources
 
 
 
 
 
 
 
 "Merritt Brothers". Minnesota Historical Library. 
 "Economic Impacts of the American Steel Industry". Timothy J. Considine. University of Wyoming. 2012.

External links 
 The Merritt Family and the Mesabi Iron Range in MNopedia, the Minnesota Encyclopedia

American families
History of mining in the United States